José Vilchis (born 30 September 1950) is a Mexican gymnast. He competed in eight events at the 1968 Summer Olympics. On 21 February 2023, Vilchis was sentenced to 96 years in prison in Illinois after being convicted of eight counts of criminal sexual assault.

References

External links
 

1950 births
Living people
Mexican male artistic gymnasts
Olympic gymnasts of Mexico
Gymnasts at the 1968 Summer Olympics
Sportspeople from Mexico City
Gymnasts at the 1975 Pan American Games
Pan American Games bronze medalists for Mexico
Pan American Games medalists in gymnastics
Medalists at the 1975 Pan American Games
20th-century Mexican people